A list of films produced in Italy in 1994 (see 1994 in film):

See also
1994 in Italian television

External links
Italian films of 1994 at the Internet Movie Database

1994
Films
Italian